The Kurdish Sun, also commonly referred to by its kurdish name: , is a burning golden sun and the national emblem of the Kurds. It has a religious and cultural history among the Kurds, dating back to ancient times. It's also found inside the flag of Kurdistan and the official flag of the Kurdistan Region. The sun disk of the emblem contains 21 rays of equal size and shape. Number 21 is a venerable number, standing for the renaissance in the ancient and original Kurdish religion, Yazdani, and its modern branches. The number 21 also symbolizes March 21, the holiday of Newroz, which is the Kurdish New Year.

History

Flags used

References

Kurdish nationalist symbols
Cultural history of Kurdistan